This is a list of films which have placed number one at the weekly box office in France during 1995. Amounts are in French franc.

Number one films

Highest-grossing films

See also
 List of French films of 1995
 Lists of box office number-one films

References

Chronology

1995
France
1995 in French cinema